Green is a color.

Green may also refer to:

Environmentalism
 Environmentally friendly, or green
 Green, a member of a Green party, a political party based on environmentalism

Arts and entertainment

Fictional characters
 Green (Gunstar Heroes), a character in the video game Gunstar Heroes
 Green (Pokémon Adventures), in Pokémon Adventures
 Green, a character in Rainbow Friends

Music

Bands 
 Green (band), a Chicago band

Albums
 Green (Green album), 1986
 Green (B'z album), 2002
 Green (Forbidden album), 1997
 Green (Steve Hillage album), 1978
 Green (Remon Stotijn album), 2006
 Green (R.E.M. album), 1988
 Green (Hank Roberts album), 2008
 Green (John Paul Young album), 1977
 Green (Hiroshi Yoshimura album), 1986

Songs
 "Green" (Brendan James song), 2008
 "Green" (Goodshirt song), 2000
 "Green" (Alex Lloyd song), 2002
 "Green", a song by Frank Sinatra from the album Frank Sinatra Conducts Tone Poems of Color
 "Green", a song by Throwing Muses from the album Throwing Muses
 "Green", a piece by Miles Davis from the 1989 album Aura
 "Green", a song by Ayumi Hamasaki from the 2008 single "Days/Green"
 "Green", a song by Orchestral Manoeuvres in the Dark from the album History of Modern
 "Green", a song by The Dandy Warhols from the album The Dandy Warhols Come Down
 "Green", a song by The Bats from the album Silverbeet
 "Green", a song by Status Quo from the album Heavy Traffic
 Several settings for voice and piano of the poem "Green" by French poet Paul Verlaine, including:
 Claude Debussy, one of the Ariettes oubliées, a song cycle composed in 1885-87
 Gabriel Fauré, one of the Cinq mélodies "de Venise", a song cycle composed in 1891
 Reynaldo Hahn, under the title "Offrande" (1891), published in the collection 20 Mélodies, 1er recueil

Other arts and entertainment
 Green (novel), a novel by Ted Dekker
 Green (picture book), a children's picture book written and illustrated by Laura Vaccaro Seeger
 "Green", an episode of the show Teletubbies
 "Green", a French-language poem by Paul Verlaine

Brands and enterprises
 Green Engine Co, a British engine manufacturer in the early part of the 20th century
 H. L. Green, formerly a chain of stores
 Green Airlines, a German airline
 Green (magazine), a monthly magazine devoted to John Deere enthusiasts

People
 Green (surname), a family name
 Green Gartside (born Paul Julian Strohmeyer in 1955), British musician and frontman of the band Scritti Politti
 Green Pinckney Russell (1861/63–1939), American educator, college president

Places

Extraterrestrial
 Green (lunar crater)
 Green (Martian crater)
 Green Valley (Mars)

Terrestrial
 Green, Kansas, United States, a city
 Green, Kentucky, United States, an unincorporated community
 Green, Ohio, United States, a city
 Green, Oregon, United States, a census-designated place
 Green County, Kentucky, United States
 Green County, Wisconsin, United States
 Green Creek (disambiguation)
 Green Glacier (Haskell Ridge), Oates Land, Antarctica
 Green Glacier, Graham Land, Antarctica
 Green Island (disambiguation)
 Green Lake (disambiguation)
 Green Mountain (disambiguation)
 Green Mountains, Vermont, United States
 Green Park, a park in the City of Westminster, central London, England
 Green River (disambiguation)
 Green Township (disambiguation)
 Green Valley (Antarctica), Ellsworth Land

Political parties
 Green Party (disambiguation)
 The Greens (disambiguation)

Schools
 Green College, Oxford, England
 Green College, University of British Columbia, Canada
 Green High School (disambiguation)

Other uses
 GREEN (certification), a real estate professional certification
 Green, a term used in professional wrestling
 GREEN, a code name for a Japanese clone of the Enigma machine
 Green, the code name for the programming-language design that was chosen for the Ada programming language
 Green or greenback, the United States dollar, specifically the Federal Reserve Notes, referring to their green color
 Putting green, a finely-cut grassed area surrounding the hole on a golf course
 Village green, or town green, public land in the middle of or adjacent to a settlement which was historically common pasture
 Green (RTA Rapid Transit station), Cleveland, Ohio, United States

See also
 
 
 Greeeen, a Japanese band
 Greene (disambiguation)
 Greens (disambiguation)
 Grin (disambiguation)
 Grün, a surname
 Justice Green (disambiguation)
 List of the shades of green
 The Green (disambiguation)